The End of Business as Usual: Rewire the Way You Work to Succeed in the Consumer Revolution is a bestselling book by digital analyst and author Brian Solis. The book examines how disruptive technology affects consumer behavior and how businesses need to either adapt or die. Katie Couric wrote the foreword.

Synopsis
The End of Business as Usual explores how the relentless assault of technology, including social, mobile, and real time web, has changed the dynamic of business and consumer. Solis believes the 24-hour personal broadcasting of today's consumer has given rise to an "egosystem." He examines how influential businesses find success inside this egosystem and its interconnected customers, or what he labels "connected consumers." Solis also explores the concept of "digital darwinism," the evolution of consumer behavior when society and technology evolve faster than one's ability to adapt.

The book outlines how to reach connected consumers through unique and indirect methods, what Solis calls "the migration from a rigid business to that of an adaptive business." Chapter titles include:

 "A Quiet Riot: The Information Divide and the Cultural Revolution"
 "Youthquake: Millennials Shake Up the Digital Lifestyle" 
  "Your Audience Is Now an Audience with Audiences" 
 "Brands Are No Longer Created, They're Co-Created"
 "What's Next? The Evolution of Business from Adaptive to Predictive"

Reception
The End of Business as Usual was blurbed by entrepreneur and Dallas Mavericks owner Mark Cuban, television producer Mark Burnett, and John Chambers, CEO of Cisco Systems. Zappos founder Tony Hsieh said, "The entire book is a call for any business to compete for the future through relevance." Seattle Pi called it "crucially important for individuals who live in our new digital culture."  Social Media Today praised the book as "so stimulating and all-encompassing that it constantly challenges your ability to focus." ZDNet describes Solis as "a master story teller with a relaxed and entertaining style that actually comes across."

Publishers Weekly named it a Top 10 Business Book for 2011. The book also made the 800-CEO-READ best seller list. It has since been translated into Japanese, Dutch, Chinese, and Bulgarian.

References

2011 non-fiction books
American non-fiction books
Wiley (publisher) books